Salih Basheer (Arabic: صالح بشير‎, born January 1, 1995, in Omdurman, Sudan) is a Sudanese Documentary photographer. During his studies of Geography at Cairo University, Egypt, he started as a self-taught photographer and subsequently studied Photojournalism at the Danish School of Media and Journalism in Aarhus, Denmark. 

Since 2018, he has been awarded several grants and prizes for photography, and his photo stories have been exhibited in Ethiopia, the Netherlands, Germany, the United Kingdom, France and the United Arab Emirates. His 2023 publication 22 Days in Between is the first photo-book ever to be authored by a Sudanese photographer.

Biography and artistic career 

After finishing secondary school in Sudan, Basheer moved to Cairo in 2013 and received his Bachelor's degree in Geography from Cairo University in 2017. During his studies in Egypt, he started as a self-taught photographer and after his graduation, began to work on his first long-term project titled Sweet Taste Of Sugarcane. This documentary photo story about the harsh conditions of students in a khalwa, a Sudanese religious school, was shown at the international Addis Foto Fest in 2018. 

His next project, called The Home Seekers, was supported by the Arab Fund for Arts and Culture (AFAC) in 2019. In this, Basheer recorded the lives of other Sudanese refugees in Cairo, who are living in exile and thus are "look[ing] inward in search for a 'home', looking for a better life and education". This visual story was exhibited in October 2021 at the Diffusion Festival in Cardiff, Wales and the same year in France as part of the group exhibition "Mon ami n'est pas d'ici" at the Institut du Monde Arabe's exhibition space in Tourcoing, as well as at the festival "Les Rencontres à l'échelle" in Marseille.                                                                                                                                                                                                    

In 2020, Basheer started a diploma course in photojournalism at the Danish school of media and journalism (DMJX) in Aarhus and was awarded a scholarship by The VII Foundation. In addition, he obtained the Shahidul Alam Grant for the development of independent photojournalism by the Danish School of Media and Journalism.

Reception 
In 2021, Basheer received the W. Eugene Smith Memorial Fund student grant for his narrative project 22 Days in Between, remembering the loss of his parents and the challenges of settling into a new home with his grandmother. According to the fund, "This project is Salih’s visual process of learning more about his parents and himself and serves as a method of healing from the trauma of losing his parents. Salih says that having a camera in his hand gave him the courage and comfort level to ask questions about his parents and their deaths." For the same visual story, Basheer was awarded the Everyday Projects Grant, where only two winners were selected among more than 450 applications. In 2022, he received another grant from AFAC through their visual arts program for 22 Days in Between. Among some 75 artistic projects representing contemporary African art, his photographs were selected for the 2022 African Photography Encounters in Bamako, Mali.

In June 2022, the British Journal of Photography presented Basheer as one of 15 upcoming photographers to watch. Having been selected from nearly 500 nominations, their work shows "where photography is heading". As a photojournalist, Basheer has published his pictures from Sudan in TIME magazine, The New York Times, The Washington Post, CNN World, Al Jazeera and other international news media.

In January 2023, Basheer published 22 Days in Between, the first ever photo-book by a Sudanese photographer, that evokes his early childhood and memories of his parents, who died within the period of 22 days, when Basheer was only 3 years old. An article in the British Journal of Photography described this photo-book as an "introspective narrative [...] explored through various formats: personal writing, self-portraits, archive images, and drawings that Basheer drew recently but from the perspective of a child – to uphold the idea that he is still a kid longing to bond with his parents." In his review in The Washington Post, Kenneth Dickerman said:

Publications 
 22 Days in Between: Photographs from Sudan, Copenhagen: Disko Bay, 2023. .

Grants and awards 

2021, W. Eugene Smith Memorial Fund Student Grant
2021, Everyday Projects Grant
2019, Arab Documentary Photography Program, Magnum Foundation & the Prince Claus Fund
2022, AFAC Visual Arts Program
2022, Tasweer, The Sheikh Saoud Al Thani Awards
2022, Counter Histories initiative grant, Magnum Foundation
2022, Contemporary African Photography Prize, CAP Prize Shortlist

Group exhibitions
2018, Addis Foto Fest, group exhibition, fifth edition, Addis Ababa, Ethiopia.
2019, Slideshow Fest, the Odesa Photo Days Festival, Odesa, Ukraine.
2019, Vantage Point Sharjah 7, Sharjah Art Foundation art spaces Al Mureijah Square Gallery 1 & 2, Sharjah, UAE.
2019, Arab Street, Vol II, Gulf Photo Plus, Dubai, UAE.
2019, Invisible Borders, slide show presentation 12th Bamako Photography Encounters, Bamako, Mali.
2020, All What I Want is Life, Gulf Photo Plus, Dubai, UAE.
2020, Connecting views: 16 talents from the APJD, Africa Museum, Berg en Dal, the Netherlands.
2021, World Press Photo Exhibition in Oldenburg, Germany.
2021, Through the lens of - Photographers from the African Photojournalism Database (APJD), Tropenmuseum, Amsterdam, the Netherlands.
2021, More than a Number, Diffusion Photo Festival, Cardiff, Wales, United Kingdom.
2021, Mon ami n'est pas d'ici, Les Rencontres à l'échelle, Marseille, France.
2021, Mon ami n'est pas d'ici, Institut du Monde Arabe-Tourcoing, Tourcoing, France.
2022, 13th edition of African Photography Encounter, Bamako, Mali.

See also 

 Photography in Sudan

References

External links 

French magazine Afrique In Visu interviewing Salih Basheer (in French)
Salih Basheer on artsy.net

1995 births
People from Omdurman
Sudanese photographers
Sudanese artists
Living people
21st-century Sudanese artists